is a former Japanese Nippon Professional Baseball player.

External links

1970 births
Living people
Baseball people from Toyama Prefecture
Japanese baseball players
Nippon Professional Baseball infielders
Yokohama Taiyō Whales players
Yokohama BayStars players
Orix BlueWave players
Managers of baseball teams in Japan